The Ring of Allaire is a novel by Susan Dexter published in 1981.

Plot summary
The Ring of Allaire is a novel in which a young apprentice wizard must complete the quest of his master to rescue a princess imprisoned long ago by the ice-lord, after the master is killed.

Reception
Greg Costikyan reviewed The Ring of Allaire in Ares Magazine #12 and commented that "competently written, but with nothing new to say [...] Light entertainment. So, now what?"

Reviews
Review by Don D'Ammassa (1986) in Science Fiction Chronicle, #80 May 1986

References

1981 novels